Robert Arthur Sanders, 1st Baron Bayford  (20 June 1867 – 24 February 1940) was an English barrister and politician.

Background and education
The eldest of the three sons of Arthur Sanders, a barrister, of Fernhill, Wootton Bridge, Isle of Wight, Sanders was born at 27 Norfolk Square, Paddington, Middlesex. He was educated at Harrow and Balliol College, Oxford, where he graduated with first class honours in law. He joined the Inner Temple and was called to the bar in 1891.

Political career
Sanders was Conservative Member of Parliament for Bridgwater, Somerset from 1910 until 1923. During this time he also served from 1911 to 1917 as a Lieutenant-Colonel with the Royal North Devon Yeomanry, serving at Gallipoli, and in Egypt and Palestine. He was appointed a deputy lieutenant of Somerset in 1912.

He was Treasurer of the Household (Government Deputy Chief Whip in the House of Commons), 1918–1919, and a junior Lord of the Treasury from 1919 until 1921. He then held ministerial office as Under-Secretary of State for War from 1921 to 1922 and Minister of Agriculture and Fisheries from 1922 to 1924. He was created a Baronet in the 1920 New Year Honours and appointed to the Privy Council in 1922, entitling him to the style "The Right Honourable".

He sat for Wells from 1924 to 1929, when he was raised to the peerage as Baron Bayford, of Stoke Trister in the County of Somerset.

Personal life
Sanders married Lucy Sophia, daughter of William Halliday, in 1893. They had one son Arthur Sanders and two daughters. As his only son committed suicide in 1920, the title became extinct on Bayford's death in February 1940, aged 72. Lady Bayford died in September 1957.

Honours

Footnotes

References
Biography, Oxford Dictionary of National Biography
Who Was Who

External links 
 

|-

1867 births
People from Paddington
Alumni of Balliol College, Oxford
People educated at Harrow School
British Army personnel of World War I
Barons in the Peerage of the United Kingdom
Members of the Privy Council of the United Kingdom
Treasurers of the Household
Agriculture ministers of the United Kingdom
Sanders, Robert Arthur
Sanders, Robert Arthur
Sanders, Robert Arthur
Sanders, Robert Arthur
Sanders, Robert Arthur
Sanders, Robert Arthur
UK MPs who were granted peerages
1940 deaths
Deputy Lieutenants of Somerset
Royal North Devon Yeomanry officers
Barons created by George V